Yearning is a 1993 Japanese drama film directed by Bandō Tamasaburō V. It was entered into the 43rd Berlin International Film Festival.

Cast
 Sayuri Yoshinaga as Onami
 Kyoko Kataoka as Kaede
 Kirin Kiki as Omatsu
 Toshiyuki Nagashima as Odabe
 Hiroyuki Nagato as Customer
 Sumie Sasaki as Osawa
 Touta Tarumi
 Rokko Toura
 Katsuhiko Watabiki
 Shôji Yasui

References

External links

1993 films
1990s Japanese-language films
1993 drama films
Japanese drama films
1990s Japanese films